The Red and Black Alliance is a nationalist  political party in Albania. It was created by Kreshnik Spahiu, the former Deputy Head of the High Council of Justice of Albania. It has sometimes been described as ultra-nationalist. It is the first nationalist/far right party in Albania to be led by a woman, Lumturi Ratkoceri.

History
On March 20, 2012 the Alliance turned into a political party.

On January 8, 2013, the Alliance requested permission from the Central Election Commission of Albania to hold a referendum for the union of Albania with Kosovo.

On that same date the Alliance denounced to the Law enforcement authorities of Albania the member of parliament Spiro Ksera, current Minister of Labor, Social Affairs and Equal Opportunities of Albania, for anti national activities, connections with the Greek extremist party of Golden Dawn, and for having employed as a counselor Theofan Kaliviotis, an Albania-born ethnic Greek, who is the head of the irredentist movement for the Independence of Northern Epirus from Albania.

Chairmen of AK

See also
Vetëvendosje!

References

External links
Official website
Facebook page

2012 establishments in Albania
Albanian nationalist parties
Political parties in Albania
Political parties established in 2012
Social conservative parties